Paul Carson may refer to:

 Paul Carson (sportscaster) (1950–2010), Canadian sports broadcaster
 Paul Carson (novelist) (born 1949), Irish-born doctor and a novelist
 Paul Carson, character in Shadow Play
 Paul Carson (composer) from List of Grove Plays